Panchavadyam (Malayalam: പഞ്ചവാദ്യം), literally meaning an orchestra of five instruments, is basically a temple art form that has evolved in Kerala. Of the five instruments, four — timila, maddalam, ilathalam and idakka — belong to the percussion category, while the fifth, kombu, is a wind instrument.

Much like any chenda melam, panchavadyam is characterised by a pyramid-like rhythmic structure with a constantly increasing tempo coupled with a proportional decrease in the number of beats in cycles. However, in contrast to a chenda melam, panchavadyam uses different instruments (though ilathalam and kompu are common to both), is not related very closely to any temple ritual and, most importantly, permits much personal improvisation while filling up the rhythmic beats on the timila, maddalam and idakka.

Panchavadyam bases itself on the seven-beat thripuda (also spelt thripuda) thaalam (taal) but amusingly sticks to the pattern of the eight-beat chempata thaalam — at least until its last parts. Its pendulum beats in the first stage (pathikaalam) total 896, and halves itself with each stage, making it 448 in the second, 224 in the third, 112 in the fourth and 56 in the fifth. After this, panchavadyam has a relatively loose second half with as many stages, the pendulum beats of which would now scale down to 28, 14, 7, 3.5(three-and-a-half) and 1.

Whether panchavadyam is originally a feudal art is still a matter of debate among scholars, but its elaborate form in vogue today came into existence in the 1930s. It was primarily the brainchild of late maddalam artistes Venkichan Swami (Thiruvillwamala Venkateswara Iyer) and his disciple Madhava Warrier in association with late timila masters Annamanada Achutha Marar and Chengamanad Sekhara Kurup. Subsequently it was promoted the late idakka master Pattirath Sankara Marar. They dug space for a stronger foundation (the Pathikaalam), thus making pachavadyam a five-stage (kaalam) concert with an intelligent mixture of composed and improvised parts. Spanning about two hours, it has several phrases where each set of the instruments complement the others more like harmony in the Western orchestra than the concept of melody in India. Much like in Panchari and other kinds of chenda melam, panchavadyam, too, has its artistes lined up in two oval-shaped halves, facing each other. However, unlike any classical chenda melam, panchavadyam seemingly gains pace in the early stages itself, thereby tending to sound more casual and breezy right from its start, beginning after three lengthy, stylised blows on the conch (shankhu).

A panchavadyam is anchored and led by the timila artist at the centre of his band of instrumentalists, behind whom line up the ilathalam players. Opposite them stand the maddalam players in a row, and behind them are the kompu players. Idakka players, usually two, stand on both sides of the aisle separating the timila and maddalam line-up. A major panchavadyam will have 60 artistes.

Panchavadyam is still largely a temple art, but it has come out of its precincts to be seen performed during non-religious occasions like cultural pageantry and according welcome to VIPs.

Major venues 

There are several central and northern Kerala temples that have been traditionally playing host to major pachavadyam performances. Prominent festivals featuring them are Thrissur Pooram (its renowned Panchavadyam event is known as 'Madhathil Varavu'), Nadappura Panchavadyam at Wadakancheri Siva Temple participating to famous Uthralikkavu Vela at Wadakancheri, Kaladi Panchavadyam ulsavam, Machattu Thiruvanikkavu vela, Nenmara-Vallangi vela, Kizhakkencherry Ratholsavam, Vayilliamkunnu Pooram, Pariyanampatta pooram, Chinakathoor pooram, Varavoor Palakkal Karthika vela, Tirumandhamkunnu pooram purappadu, Tripunithura Sree Poornathrayeesa Aarattu, Tripunithura Thamaramkulangara Makaravilakku, Thiruvona Mahotsavam at Sree Vamanamoorthy Temple Thrikkakara, Kunnathurmedu Balamurali Sree Krishna Jayanthi Maholsavam and Cherpulassery Ayyappan Kavu ulsavam, besides temples in places like Chottanikkara, Odakkali, Vaikom, Ambalapuzha, Perumbavur, Pazhur, Ramamangalam, Ooramana, Nayathodu, Chengamanad, Elavoor, Chennamangalam, Triprayar/Arratupuzha, Irinjalakuda, Alathara sree kodikkunnnath pooram (Anakkallu desham), Thiruvillwamala, Pallassena, Pallavoor and several renowned temples in Malabar like Kottakkal Viswambhara Temple and Kottakkal Pandamangalam Sreekrishna Temple, Mannarkkad Pallikurup Manadala Niramala and further up in Tulu Nadu. Chembuthara Kodungallur Bagavathi Temple on the first Tuesday of Malayalam month "Makaram". On every 2 October Panchavadhyam is conducted on Annamanada Mahadeva Temple on behalf of late Annamanada Peethambara Marar, Achutha Marar and Parameshwara Marar popularly known as Annamanada Threyyam.

Training institutes 

Some of the known institutions that give formal training in panchavadyam are Kerala Kalamandalam and Kshetra Kalapeetham in Vaikom and also kshethrakala kshethram kongad. In addition to the above Sri. Thrikkampuram Krishnankutty Marar himself trained many people. All the panchavadyam performances in Kerala will have at least one of his disciples as a performer.

See also
 Parisha Vadyam
 Pandi Melam
 Panchari melam
 Thayambaka
 Kerala Kalamandalam
 Music of Kerala

References

External links

 Melam Collections
 School of Panchavadhyam
 Youtube Video

Kerala music
Percussion ensembles
Hindu music
Indian musical groups